Tijmen Snel (born 11 December 1997) is a Dutch speed skater who is specialized in the sprint distances.

Personal records

Tournament overview

source:

References

Living people
1997 births
Dutch male speed skaters
Sportspeople from Amsterdam